Zongzi, rouzong or simply zong (Cantonese Jyutping: zung2) is a traditional Chinese rice dish made of glutinous rice stuffed with different fillings and wrapped in bamboo leaves (generally of the species Indocalamus tessellatus), or sometimes with reed or other large flat leaves. They are cooked by steaming or boiling. In the Western world, they are also known as rice dumplings or sticky rice dumplings.

Names 

As it diffused to other regions of Asia over many centuries, zongzi became known by various names in different languages and cultures, including phet htoke in Burmese-speaking areas (such as Myanmar), nom chang in Cambodia, machang in Philippines, bachang in Indonesia, khanom chang in Laos, and ba-chang in Thailand.

Vietnamese cuisine also has a variation on this dish known as bánh ú tro or bánh tro.

In Malaysia, Indonesia, Singapore, and Taiwan, zongzi is known as bakcang, bacang, or zang (from Hokkien , as Hokkien is commonly used among overseas Chinese).  Similarly, zongzi is more popularly known as machang among Chinese Filipinos in the Philippines.

Japanese cuisine has leaf-wrapped glutinous rice flour dumplings called chimaki. They may be tetrahedral, square, rectangular, or long narrow conical in shape.

In some areas of the United States, particularly California and Texas, zongzi are often known as "Chinese tamales".

In Mauritius, zongzi (typically called zong), is a traditional dish which continues to be eaten by the Sino-Mauritian and by the Overseas Chinese communities. It is especially eaten on the Dragon Boat Festival, a traditional festive event, to commemorate the death of Qu Yuan.

Popular origin myths

What has become established popular belief amongst the Chinese is that zongzi has since the days of yore been a food-offering to commemorate the death of Qu Yuan, a famous poet from the kingdom of Chu who lived during the Warring States period. Known for his patriotism, Qu Yuan tried to counsel his king to no avail, and drowned himself in the Miluo River in 278 BC. The kind-hearted Chinese people in the same era as Qu Yuan were grateful for Qu Yuan's talent and loyalty to serve the country. They cast rice dumplings into the Miluo River on the day when Qu Yuan was thrown into the river every year, hoping that the fish in the river would eat the rice dumplings without harming Qu Yuan's body.

Qu Yuan died in 278 BC, but the earliest known documented association between him and the zong dumplings occurs much later, in the mid 5th century (Shishuo Xinyu , or A New Account of the Tales of the World)., And a widely observed popular cult around him did not develop until the 6th century AD, as far as can be substantiated by evidence. But by the 6th century, sources attest to the offering of zongzi on the Double Fifth Festival (5th day of the 5th month of the lunar calendar) being connected with the figure of Qu Yuan.

As for the origin myth, a fable recounts that the people commemorated the drowning death of Qu Yuan on the Double Fifth day by casting rice stuffed in bamboo tubes; but the practice changed in the early Eastern Han dynasty (1st century AD), when the ghost of Qu Yuan appeared in a dream to a man named Ou Hui and instructed him to seal the rice packet with chinaberry (or Melia) leaves and bind it with colored string, to repel the dragons (jiaolong) that would otherwise consume them.

Also, Qu Yuan had (dubiously, by "folklore" or by common belief) become connected with the boat races held on the Double Fifth, datable by another 6th century source. 《荊楚歲時記》(6th c.), under the "Fifth Day of the Fifth Month" heading. Modern media has printed a version of the legend which says that the locals had rushed out in dragonboats to try retrieve his body and threw packets of rice into the river to distract the fish from eating the poet's body.

History 

Zongzi (sticky rice dumplings) are traditionally eaten during the Duanwu Festival (Double Fifth Festival) which falls on the fifth day of the fifth month of the Chinese lunar calendar, and commonly known as the "Dragon Boat Festival" in English. The festival falls each year on a day in late-May to mid-June in the International calendar.

The practice of eating zongzi on the Double Fifth or summer solstice is concretely documented in literature from around the late Han (2nd–3rd centuries). At the end of the Eastern Han dynasty, people made zong, also called jiao shu, lit. "horned/angled millet") by wrapping sticky rice with the leaves of the Zizania latifolia plant (a sort of wild rice) and boiling them in lye (grass-and-wood ash water). The name jiao shu may imply  "ox-horn shape", or cone-shape. That the zong or ziao shu prepared in this way was eaten on the occasion of the Double Fifth (Duanwu) is documented in works as early as the Fengsu Tongyi, AD 195). These festive rice dumplings are also similarly described in General Zhou Chu (236–297)'s Fengtu Ji, "Record of Local Folkways" Various sources claim that this Fengtu Ji contains the first documented reference regarding zongzi, even though it dates somewhat later than the Fengsu Tongyi.

In the Jin dynasty (AD 266–420), zongzi was officially a Dragon Boat Festival food. Anecdotally, an official called  from the Jin dynasty once sent zongzi which used  (the fruit of Alpinia oxyphylla or sharp leaf galangal) as additional filling; this type of dumpling was then dubbed yizhi zong (literally "dumplings to increase wisdom"). Later in the Northern and Southern dynasties, mixed zongzi appeared, the rice was filled with fillings such as meat, chestnuts, jujubes, red beans, and they were exchanged as gifts to relatives and friends.

In the 6th century (Sui to early Tang dynasty), the dumpling is also being referred to as "tubular zong", and they were being made by being packed inside "young bamboo" tubes. The 6th century source for this states that the dumplings were eaten on the Summer Solstice, (instead of the Double Fifth).

In the Tang dynasty, the shape of zongzi appeared conical and diamond-shaped, and the rice which was used to make zongzi was as white as jade. Datang zongzi (i.e. the zongzi eaten in Tang Imperial period) was also recorded in some classical-era Japanese literature, which was heavily influenced by Tang Chinese culture.

In the Northern Song dynasty period, the "New augmentation to the Shuowen Jiezi" glossed zong as rice with reed leaves wrapped around it. Mijiian Zong (zongzi with glacé fruit) was also popular in the Song dynasty. Also during the Song Dynasty, there were many preserved fruit zongzi. At this time also appeared a pavilion filled with zongzi for advertising, which showed that eating zongzi in the Song dynasty had been very fashionable.

In the Yuan and Ming dynasties, the wrapping material had changed from gu (wild rice) leaf to ruo (the Indocalamus tessellatus bamboo) leaf, and then to reed leaves,and filled with materials like bean paste, pine nut kernel, pork, walnut, jujube, and so on. The varieties of zongzi were more diverse.

During the Ming and Qing dynasties, zongzi became auspicious food. At that time, scholars who took the imperial examinations would eat "pen zongzi", which was specially given to them at home, before going to the examination hall.  Because it looked long and thin like a writing brush, the pronunciation of "pen zongzi" is similar to the Chinese word for "pass", which was for good omen.  Ham zongzi appeared in the Qing dynasty.

Every year in early May of the lunar calendar, the Chinese people still soak glutinous rice, wash the leaves and wrap up zongzi.

Description 

The shapes of zongzi vary, and range from being approximately tetrahedral in southern China to an elongated cone in northern China. In the Chiang Kai-shek Memorial Hall in Taipei, plastic mock-ups of rectangular zongzi are displayed as an example of the zongzi eaten by Chiang Kai-shek. Wrapping zongzi neatly is a skill that is passed down through families, as are the recipes. Making zongzi is traditionally a family event in which everyone helps out.

While traditional zongzi are wrapped in bamboo leaves, the leaves of lotus, reed, maize, banana, canna, shell ginger, and pandan sometimes are used as substitutes in other countries. Each kind of leaf imparts its own unique aroma and flavor to the rice.

The fillings used for zongzi vary from region to region, but the rice used is almost always glutinous rice (also called "sticky rice" or "sweet rice"). Depending on the region, the rice may be lightly precooked by stir-frying or soaked in water before using. In the north, fillings are mostly red bean paste and tapioca or taro. Northern style zongzi tend to be sweet and dessert-like. In the northern region of China, zongzi filled with jujubes are popular. 

Southern-style zongzi, however, tend to be more savoury or salty. Fillings of Southern-style zongzi include ham, salted duck egg, pork belly, taro, shredded pork or chicken, Chinese sausage, pork fat, and shiitake mushrooms.  However, as the variations of zongzi styles have traveled and become mixed, today one can find all kinds of them at traditional markets, and their types are not confined to which side of the Yellow River they originated from.

Zongzi need to be steamed or boiled for several hours depending on how the rice is prepared prior to being added, along with the fillings. With the advent of modern food processing, pre-cooked zongzi (usually in vacuum packs or frozen) are now available.

Fillings 

Sweet:

 White sugar (mixed into rice, frequently present)
 Mung beans, split and dehulled
 Red bean paste
 Lotus seed
 Yam
 Jujube

Salty or savory:

 Soy sauce (mixed into rice, almost always present)
 Chinese sausage
 Mushrooms, preferably xiang gu
 Salted duck egg yolks
 Ham
 Hard-boiled eggs
 Pork, preferably pork belly
 Conpoy (dried scallops)
 Red-cooked meats
 Chicken

Either or neutral:

 Nuts
 Water chestnuts
 Cooked peanuts
 Vegetables

Variations

China

Jiaxing zongzi (嘉兴粽子): This is a kind of zongzi famous in mainland China and named after the city Jiaxing. Typically savory with the rice mixed with soy sauce and having pork, water chestnut and salted duck egg yolk as its filling, but sweet ones with mung bean or red bean filling also exist.
 Jia zong (假粽): Instead of glutinous rice, balls of glutinous rice flour (so no individual grains of rice are discernible) are used to enclose the fillings of the zongzi. These "fake zong" are typically smaller than most and are much stickier.
 Jianshui zong (碱水粽): These "alkaline water zong"  are typically eaten as a dessert item rather than as part of the main meal. The glutinous rice is treated with jianzongshui (碱粽水, alkali[ne] zongzi water, aqueous sodium carbonate or potassium carbonate), giving them their distinctive yellow color. Jianshui zong typically contain either no filling or are filled with a sweet mixture, such as sweet bean paste. Sometimes, a certain redwood sliver (蘇木) is inserted for color and flavor. They are often eaten with sugar or light syrup.
 Cantonese jung (广东粽): This is representative of the southern variety of zongzi, usually consisting of marinated meat, such as pork belly, and duck, with other ingredients like green bean paste, mushrooms, dried scallops, and salted egg york. Cantonese jung are small, the front is square, back has a raised sharp angle, shaped like an awl.
Chiu Chou jung (潮州粽): This is a variation of Cantonese jung with red bean paste, pork belly, chestnut, mushroom, and dried shrimp, in a triangular prism.
 Banlam zang (闽南粽): Xiamen, Quanzhou area is very famous for its pork dumplings, made with braised pork with pork belly, plus mushrooms, shrimp, and so on.
 Sichuan zong (四川粽): Sichuan people like to eat spicy food, so they make spicy rice dumplings. They add Sichuan peppercorns, chili powder, Sichuan salt, and a little preserved pork, wrapped into four-cornered dumplings. Cooked and then roasted, it tastes tender and flavorful.
 Beijing zong (北京粽): The Beijing zong are sweet and often eaten cold. Common fillings include red dates and bean paste, as well as preserved fruit.

Taiwan
 Taiwanese zongzi are regionally split by the process of cooking rather than filling.
 Northern Taiwanese zongzi (北部粽) are wrapped with husks of Phyllostachys makinoi bamboo (桂竹籜), then steamed.
 Southern Taiwanese zongzi (南部粽) are wrapped with leaves of Bambusa oldhamii (麻竹葉), then boiled.
 The filling is classified simply by eating habits:
 Vegetarian zongzi in Taiwan is made with dry peanut flakes.
 The meat-filled zongzi in Taiwan is made with fresh pork, chicken, duck, egg yolk, mushroom, dried shrimps, or fried scallions.

Japan
 Japanese chimaki are very similar to the Chinese versions but possibly with different fillings, and are divided into savory and sweet types.
 A special sweet chimaki is eaten on Children's Day (kodomo no hi, May 5), and is identifiable by its long narrow conical shape.

Mauritius
 Sweet zong is a zongzi made of a plain rice (i.e. without any fillings) which is eaten with crushed peanut in sugar.
 Salty zong contains meat, beans and other fillings in the rice.

Malaysia and Singapore
 Nyonya chang (娘惹粽): A specialty of Peranakan cuisine, these zongzi are made similarly to those from southern China. However, pandan leaves are often used, in addition to bamboo leaves, for the wrapping while minced pork with candied winter melon, a spice mix, and sometimes ground roasted peanuts are used as the fillings. As with a common practice found in Peranakan pastries, part of the rice on these zongzi are often dyed blue with the extract from blue pea flower to add to the aesthetic.

 In Malaysia, ketupat daun palas is a delicacy during festival made by Muslim majority of Malaysia. Like zongzi, ketupat is made from glutinous rice. Soaked glutinous rice is wrapped inside a triangle of "daun palas" a type of palm tree leaves, then steamed. Ketupats are eaten with beef or chicken rendang, a type of curry, during Aidilfitri and Aidiladha festivals. Another variation is lemang, made by cooking the glutinous rice inside of empty bamboo shells using hot coals rather than steaming.

Museum 
The Jiaxing Zongzi Culture Museum in Jiaxing, China has exhibits of the cultural history and various styles of zongzi.

Gallery

See also 

 Bánh chưng
 Bánh tét
 Lo mai gai, or lotus leaf wrap
 Chinese sticky rice
 Corunda
 Chunga pitha
 Hallaca
 Ketupat
 List of Chinese dishes
 List of dumplings
 List of rice dishes
 List of stuffed dishes
 Lontong
 Pamonha
 Pasteles
 Peranakan cuisine
 Tamale
 Suman

Explanatory notes

References 
Citations

Bibliography

External links 

 Authentic Zongzi Recipe

 

Dumplings
Chinese bakery products
Chinese rice dishes
Chinese words and phrases
Glutinous rice dishes
Malaysian cuisine
Singaporean cuisine
Mauritian cuisine
Stuffed dishes